I (or Bass Communion I) is the first studio album released by British musician, songwriter, and producer Steven Wilson under the pseudonym Bass Communion in 1998. It was reissued in December 2001 through Hidden Art record label.

The basis of both "Drugged" pieces were reused for the title track of No-Man's album Together We're Stranger as well as "Drugged 3" from Bass Communion II.

Track listing

Bonus Track on Vinyl 
„No News Is Good News“                                                 (8:10)

Personnel

Bass Communion
 Steven Wilson – Instruments, all songwriting

Additional personnel
 Theo Travis – Soprano Saxophones on "Drugged"
 Robert Fripp - Soundscapes on "Drugged 2" (sampled from a tape of soundscapes improvised by Fripp at No-Man's Land in 1993)
 Carl Glover – Graphic design and photography

Release history

External links 
 Bass Communion Site at Steven Wilson Headquarters

References 

1998 debut albums
Bass Communion albums